Rendezvous FC is  a Barbadian football club that currently plays in the Barbados Premier Division, the top level of football on Barbados. The current manager is Arleigh Collymore. The club's home ground is the  Emmerton Playing Field in Saint Michael.

Crest
The club's crest features two hands shaking, with a flag imprinted on each sleeve: one with the flag of Barbados and the other the flag of neighboring Saint Vincent and the Grenadines.

Squad

Achievements
Barbados Premier Division Runner-Up (1): 2015
Barbados FA Cup Winner (1): 2013
Barbados FA Cup Runner-Up: 2015

References

External links
Barbados FA profile
Soccerway profile

Football clubs in Barbados